Aluminum Corporation of China Limited (known as Chalco), is a Chinese company listed in Hong Kong and in New York. A multinational aluminium company, its headquarters are in Beijing, People's Republic of China. It is the world's second-largest alumina producer and third-largest primary aluminium producer (and the largest producer in China).

Chinalco is principally engaged in the extraction of aluminium oxide, electrolysis of virgin aluminium and the processing and production of aluminium as well as traded trading and engineering and technical services.

Its primary listing is on the Shanghai Stock Exchange and it is a constituent of the SSE 180 index. It has a secondary listing on the Hong Kong Stock Exchange.

The major shareholder of the company was Aluminum Corporation of China known as Chinalco, a state owned enterprise.

Organization
The company has a number of distinct business segments including (1) alumina refining, (2) primary aluminum smelting, and (3) energy.  The alumina refining segment consists of mining and purchasing bauxite, refining bauxite into alumina, and production and sales of alumina chemicals and metal gallium.  The aluminum smelting segment smelts alumina to produce primary aluminum and also produces carbon products, aluminum alloy products, and other aluminum products.  Finally the energy segment produces coal, generates electricity from coal, develops wind and solar power, manufactures new energy equipment, and integrates coal electricity generation with aluminum operations.

Until 2013, it was also engaged in aluminum fabrication but has since sold this business line.

History
Aluminum Corporation of China (Chinalco) is a state-backed holding company established to be the primary aluminium producer in the People's Republic of China in 2001. It is the parent company of Aluminum Corporation of China Limited (Chalco) which is listed on the New York, Hong Kong and Shanghai stock exchanges.

Effective from 10 June 2008, Chalco was added to the Hang Seng Index Constituent Stock (blue chip).

In 2009, mining giant Rio Tinto declined a contemplated deal in which Chalco would pay $19.5 billion in order to increase its stake in Rio Tinto. Rio Tinto ultimately declined because "there are lots of Aussies in high political places who don't want ... land and resources sold to China." Along with the 2005 failed attempt by China National Offshore Oil Corporation (CNOOC) to buy Unocal Corporation (which ultimately sold to Chevron Corporation for $1.5 billion less than CNOOC's offer), the failed Rio Tinto deal was perceived in China as part of a coordinated effort in the West to stall China's rise.

Chinalco is investing $3 billion to begin open-cast mining operations, within three to four years, in Morococha District, Peru. The company plans to extract copper ore from Mount Toromocho.

Chinalco holds a 9% stake in the Anglo-Australian mining company Rio Tinto. Rio Tinto controls large Iron ore reserves in Australia. On June 5, Rio Tinto broke a deal for Chinalco to purchase a larger stake in the company, with support by rival Anglo-Australian mining company BHP. Rio Tinto is expected to pay a US$195 million breaking fee according to the contract signed earlier by the two parties.

In 2010, Chinalco reported a net profit of ¥778.01 million, a dramatic rise when compared with the company's ¥4.62 billion losses from the previous year.  The company credits increased prices and effective cost control strategies with the financial turnaround.

During July 2011, Chinalco signed a long-term agreement with Mongolian miner Tavan Tolgoi to import more than 15 million tons of coking coal annually to meet increased domestic demand.

Operations

Engineering and technical services
A subsidiary is China Aluminum International Engineering (Chalieco) which consists of businesses in engineering design and consultancy, engineering and construction contracting and equipment manufacturing.  As a contractor it is the 124th largest construction firm in the world as ranked by Engineering News-Record in 2013.  Chalieco was publicly listed on the Hong Kong Stock Exchange in 2012.

Aluminum fabrication
Through its aluminum fabrication unit, which was sold in 2013, Chinalco sold casting products, slab band products, foils, squeezing products, forging products, powder products, die-casting products, remelted aluminum ingots, and gallium metal and gallium oxide. These products are used in construction, electricity, packaging, transportation, nondurable consumer goods, hard board material, wire and cable, ceramics, refractory material, laundry, petrochemical, and aerospace industries.

Peru
As of 2013, Morococha was the site of a planned open pit copper mine to be operated by Aluminum Corporation of China Limited. A new town for the 5,000 residents of Morococha has been built about 6 miles away, but some residents were reported to be resisting relocation. The mine is projected to produce about 250,000 tons of copper a year for about 35 years.

In April 2017, owing to Peru's increasing importance as a copper supplier to China, Chinalco announced an investment of $1.3 billion to expand copper production after failing to reach its output target last year. The expansion is projected to add 70,000 tonnes a year to the project.

Chinalco has invested $1.3 billion in its Toromocho mine in 2018, which it acquired in 2007. The project came online in 2013 and is, besides copper, primarily producing silver and molybdenum. The investment constitutes an increase of 45 percent by 2020, with the value of production from this move  expected to exceed $2 billion.

Joint Venture with Rio Tinto 
In 2011, China Aluminum Corporation and Rio Tinto, the world's second largest mining company, created a joint venture in order to explore deposits in China. According to Rio Tinto chief executive Tom Albanese, the joint venture was meant to be “an important milestone in the expanding relationship between Rio Tinto and China.” Chinalco was the majority stakeholder of the project, holding 51% of shares, while Rio Tinto held 49%.

On January 18, 2017, it was reported that the two corporations had terminated the joint venture, and had begun to liquidate the joint venture company, Chinalco Rio Tinto Exploration Co.

References

External links

Companies formerly in the Hang Seng China Enterprises Index
Manufacturing companies based in Beijing
Companies formerly listed on the New York Stock Exchange
Companies listed on the Hong Kong Stock Exchange
Companies listed on the Shanghai Stock Exchange
Aluminium companies of China
Former companies in the Hang Seng Index
Companies in the Hang Seng China Enterprises Index
Government-owned companies of China
Metal companies of China
Non-renewable resource companies established in 2001
2001 establishments in China